Virgin Soil Upturned is a 1939 Soviet drama film directed by Yuli Raizman.

Plot
In January 1930, the farm Gremyachy Log arrives collectivization former sailor, communist-twenty-five-thousander, a former worker of the Leningrad plant, Semyon Davydov. In the farm he meets and gets acquainted with Makar Nagulnov, the head of the local party cell, and the chairman of  village council, Andrei Razmyotnov. The members of  party convened a meeting of  Gremyachins activists and the poor. The present farmers registered in the collective farm and recorded those who should be dekulakization. The prosperous farmers did not aspire to the collective farm. At the end of February, an entry into the collective farm stopped, an enemy force acted in the farm. Dissatisfied secretly gathered to discuss how to discourage collectivization.

Cast
 Gavriil Belov as Ostrovnov
 Sergei Blinnikov as Bannik
 Mikhail Bolduman	 as Nagulnov
 Boris Dobronravov as Davydov
 Vladimir Dorofeyev as grandfather Shchukar
  as Polovtsev
 Yelena Maksimova as  Malanya Atamanchukova

See also
 And Quiet Flows the Don (film)

References

External links 

 Сценарий «Поднятой целины»

1939 films
1930s Russian-language films
Soviet drama films
1939 drama films
Mosfilm films
Films set in the Soviet Union
Soviet black-and-white films
Films based on Russian novels
Films scored by Georgy Sviridov